Lophoplusia is a genus of moths of the family Noctuidae.

Species
 Lophoplusia giffardi Swezey, 1913
 Lophoplusia psectrocera Hampson, 1913
 Lophoplusia pterylota Meyrick, 1904
 Lophoplusia violacea Swezey, 1920

References
 Lophoplusia at funet.fi
 Natural History Museum Lepidoptera genus database

Plusiinae